"Do Something" is a song written by Sam H. Stept and Bud Green for the Paramount Pictures film Nothing But the Truth (1929), in which the song was performed by Helen Kane. The scene of Kane singing this song is missing from the  only existing print of the movie.

Kane also had a hit recording of the song for Victor Records, which she recorded in 1929. The sheet music, bearing Kane's photo, and phonograph record both state that the song is from Nothing But the Truth.

The song was also used in the soundtrack of the film Syncopation (1929) where it was sung by Dorothy Lee.

The lyrics to the song are as follows:
Oh honey, oh honey!
Why is it that you act so funny?
When we should be making love?
Oh, I'm willing, I'm so willing,
But nothing that you do seems thrilling.
I long for your pettin';
Where am I gettin'?

There's the moon, way up high,
Here are you, here am I,
Oh, do, do, do something!

I ain't been hugged, and I ain't been kissed,
And I want to see just what I've missed.
So, oh do, oh do something!

I got the time and the place, and the place and the time, I know,
I got a bench and a park, and a park and a bench, and all!

You know, other pairs, they're making haste;
But, look at me, I'm just going to waste So, oh do, oh do something!Summer night, stars are low;Oh, tell me, what are we waitin' for, huh?Oh come on honey, oh come on, do something!Boop-oop-a-doop!You know, it's been told, and explained,That nothing tried is nothing gainedOh, do, do, do something!I've got a kiss and a hug and a kiss or twoI want to give them away, and I'm gonna give them away to you!Boop-boop-boop-a-doop!Sittin' around just seems so dumb;And, look at me, I'm just gettin numbSo, oh do, oh do something!All alone, just we two,And I feel so bup-bup-a-do!So, oh do, do, do!Bup-a-dup-a-dup-a-dup Boop-oop-a-doop!See also
Boop-Oop-a-DoopNothing But the Truth (1929 film)Syncopation (1929 film)''

References

External links 
Nothing But the Truth (1929) at Richard Dix website
Do Something at Heptune website
Do Something at IMDB

1929 songs
Songs written for films
Songs with music by Sam H. Stept
Songs with lyrics by Bud Green